Farish Street Neighborhood Historic District is a historic neighborhood in Jackson, Mississippi, known as a hub for Black-owned businesses up until the 1970s. Named after a family that lived and had businesses on that street for four generations, the street became a flourishing business area after the imposition of legal segregation under Jim Crow. As the black community thrived, by 1908 one third of the area of Jackson was black-owned, one third of the houses where blacks lived were black-owned, and half of black families owned their own homes. In 1915 the Farish Street neighborhood was well known as a progressive area in Jackson. Farish Street was home to Trumpet Records, Ace Records, and Speir Phonograph Company. Jackson State University, a historically Black university, was located at the corner of Farish and Griffith for about a year until it moved to its new location.

The Farish Street neighborhood was added as a historic district to the National Register of Historic Places in 1980. The neighborhood is historically significant as an economically independent black community, and as of 1980 was the largest such community in Mississippi.  Most of the properties in the district were built between 1890 and 1930.

References

African-American history of Mississippi
Historic districts on the National Register of Historic Places in Mississippi
Jackson, Mississippi
Streets in Mississippi
National Register of Historic Places in Jackson, Mississippi